Stretch can refer to:

People
Stretch (surname), a list of people
Stretch (nickname), a list

In music
Stretch Records, an independent record label
Stretch (band), a 1970s UK rock band
Stretch (rapper) (1968–1995), an American rapper and producer
Stretch (album), an album by Scott Walker
 "The Stretch", a song by Liquid Tension Experiment from the album Liquid Tension Experiment, 1998

Films
Stretch (2011 film), a French film directed by Charles de Meaux
Stretch (2014 film), an American film directed by Joe Carnahan

Fictional characters
Stretch Armstrong, an action figure introduced in 1976
Stretch, a purple toy octopus in the film Toy Story 3 (see List of Toy Story characters)
Stretch, a member of the DC Comics superteam Hero Hotline
Stretch Cunningham, a recurring character in the TV series All in the Family
Stretch Emerson, a character created by Australian western writer Leonard Frank Meares
Stretch (The Texas Chainsaw Massacre 2), the sole survivor of The Texas Chainsaw Massacre 2
Stretch, a tape measure in Handy Manny

Other uses
Stretch, the codename of version 9 of the Debian Linux operating system
Another name for the "set position", one of two legal pitching positions in baseball
Another name for a limousine
IBM 7030 Stretch, IBM's first transistorized supercomputer
Stretch Island, in the U.S. state of Washington
The Stretch (novel), a thriller by Stephen Leather, published in 2000
 The Stretch (TV series), a British television crime drama mini-series
 A variety of the game mumblety-peg

See also

Stretching (disambiguation)
Stritch (disambiguation)